Naser al-Hariri was a former member of the People's Council of Syria from Daraa. Along with fellow parliamentarian Khalil al-Rifaei, also from Daraa, he resigned from his seat in protest at the "continued killings of protesters during the 2011 protests in Syria".

Political career
On 4 July 2013, Naser al-Hariri joined the National Coalition for Syrian Revolutionary and Opposition Forces as a representative from the Hauran region of southern Syria. By 2015, he became the Secretary-General in the coalition based in Istanbul, Turkey.

In January 2017, he was one of the members of the Syrian opposition delegation that attended the peace talks in Astana. In February 2017 he was appointed as the head of opposition delegation for the Geneva IV conference on Syria, scheduled to be held on 20 February.

On 12 July 2020 he was elected as President of the National Coalition for Opposition and Revolutionary Forces of Syria, replacing Anas al-Abdah. He was succeeded by Salem al-Meslet on 15 July 2021.

References

Living people
Members of the People's Assembly of Syria
National Coalition of Syrian Revolutionary and Opposition Forces members
People from Daraa
Syrian defectors
Syrian democracy activists
1977 births